Panteleyevo is a rural locality (a village) in Razdolyevskoye Rural Settlement, Kolchuginsky District, Vladimir Oblast, Russia. The population was 28 as of 2010.

Geography 
Panteleyevo is located 19 km south of Kolchugino (the district's administrative centre) by road. Miklyaikha is the nearest rural locality.

References 

Rural localities in Kolchuginsky District